Luis Adrián Martínez Olivo, known as Adrián Martínez (born 14 July 1993) is a Venezuelan footballer who plays for Saudi Arabian club Al-Tai.

Career
In 2022 Martínez received notoriety for a bad tackle adjudged as a foul on Argentinian playmaker Lionel Messi during a World Cup qualifier between Argentina and Venezuela. That same year he joined Saudi Arabian side Al-Tai FC on a free transfer from Bolivian side Club Always Ready. He made his debut for Al-Tai on 16 December, 2022 against Abha Club.

International career
He made his debut for the full Venezuela national football team in the 2021 Copa América against Brazil.

References

1993 births
People from Ciudad Guayana
Living people
Venezuelan footballers
Venezuela international footballers
Association football defenders
A.C.C.D. Mineros de Guayana players
Metropolitanos FC players
Deportivo La Guaira players
Al-Tai FC players
Venezuelan Primera División players
Saudi Professional League players
2021 Copa América players
Venezuelan expatriate footballers
Expatriate footballers in Saudi Arabia
Venezuelan expatriate sportspeople in Saudi Arabia